Moragalla Railway Tunnel or Lion's Mouth Tunnel is the second longest railway tunnel in Sri Lanka. 

The tunnel was designed by Sir Guilford Lindsey Molesworth, the first Director-General of Railways in Ceylon (1865–1871) and constructed by F. W. Faviell. It is the last climb of the Kadugannawa Pass, and is considered to be one of the most dangerous and difficult construction projects along the railway line. The tunnel was bored from both ends meeting in the middle.

The tunnel gains its name from the overhanging rock, immediately proceeding the tunnel on the Kadugannawa end, which appears to resemble the open mouth of a roaring lion.

References

Railway tunnels in Sri Lanka
Tunnels completed in 1866
Rail transport in Kandy District